Pavel Liška (born 29 January 1972) is a Czech actor. He has appeared in more than fifty films since 1997.

Selected filmography

References

External links
 

1972 births
Living people
Czech male film actors
Janáček Academy of Music and Performing Arts alumni
Actors from Liberec
20th-century Czech male actors
21st-century Czech male actors
Czech Lion Awards winners